Inclán - Mezquita Al Ahmad is a station on Line H of the Buenos Aires Underground. Here passengers may transfer to Metrobus Sur. The station was opened on 18 October 2007, as part of the inaugural section of the line, between Once - 30 de Diciembre and Caseros.

Originally named simply "Inclán" for Inclán Street, the station was renamed in 2016 to reference the nearby Al Ahmad Mosque.

References

External links

Buenos Aires Underground stations
Railway stations opened in 2007
2007 establishments in Argentina